Roberto Lezaun Zubiria (born 23 July 1967) is a Spanish former professional cyclist. He rode in four editions of the Vuelta a España. He also competed at the 1996 Summer Olympics and the 2000 Summer Olympics.

Major results
1990
 1st  Overall Vuelta a Navarra
1991
 1st  Overall Vuelta a Andalucía
1997
 1st  National Cross-country Championships
1998
 1st  National Cross-country Championships
1999
 3rd  Cross-country, European Mountain Bike Championships

References

1967 births
Living people
Spanish male cyclists
Olympic cyclists of Spain
Cyclists at the 1996 Summer Olympics
Cyclists at the 2000 Summer Olympics
Sportspeople from Pamplona
Cyclists from Navarre